Louise Ellery (born 4 January  1977) is an Australian Paralympic track and field athlete, Commonwealth Games gold medalist and former world record holder in F32 Shot put for elite athletes with a disability. At the 2016 Rio Paralympics, she won a bronze medal.

Personal
Ellery was born in Port Moresby, Papua New Guinea. She suffered a Traumatic brain injury following a car crash in 1998. She competes in the F32 class (severe to moderate quadriplegia, but with athletes usually able to functionally propel a manual wheelchair). In Sydney in 2005, Ellery broke the world record in seated shot put at the National Championships.

Just 3 days before winning a bronze medal in the 2016 Rio Paralaympics, the now international multi-award winning short film, 'With Little Hope' was premiered. Ellery executive produced and wrote this film inspired by her personal experiences. It was released in 2017.

Athletics

Paralympic Games
At the 2004 Athletics Paralympics, she finished sixth in the Women's Shot Put F32-34/52-53. She finished again in the Women's Shot Put F32-34/52-53 at the 2008 Beijing Paralympics. At the 2012 London Games, she won the silver medal in the Women's Shot Put F32-34 with a throw of 5.90 m. She finished eighth in the Women's Club Throw F31/32/51. At the 2016 Summer Paralympics, Ellery won Bronze in the Women's Shot Put F32 with a throw of 4.19.

IPC World Championships
At the 2011 IPC Athletics World Championships in Christchurch, she won the bronze medal in the Women's Shot Put F32-34 with a throw of 6.31m and finished fifth in the Women's Club Throw F31/32/51. She did not medal at the 2013 IPC Athletics World Championships in Lyon. At the 2015 IPC Athletics World Championships in Doha, she won the bronze medal in the Women's Shot Put F32 with a throw of 4.53m. At the 2017 World Para Athletics Championships in London, England, she finished eighth in the Women's Shot Put F32 with a throw of 4.31.

Commonwealth Games

Ellery won gold medal in the women's F32–34/52/53 shot put, as a competitor in the F32 class, again breaking the world record with a throw of 6.17 metres. This was Australia’s first gold medal in the track and field events at the 2010 Delhi Commonwealth Games which took place at the Jawaharlal Nehru Stadium, Delhi.

In 2015/16, she has an ACT Academy of Sport scholarship.

References

External links

 
 
 Louise Ellery at Australian Athletics Historical Results
 With Little Hope You Tube

Paralympic athletes of Australia
Athletes (track and field) at the 2004 Summer Paralympics
Athletes (track and field) at the 2008 Summer Paralympics
Athletes (track and field) at the 2012 Summer Paralympics
Athletes (track and field) at the 2016 Summer Paralympics
Athletes (track and field) at the 2010 Commonwealth Games
Commonwealth Games gold medallists for Australia
Paralympic silver medalists for Australia
Paralympic bronze medalists for Australia
Australian female shot putters
1977 births
Living people
Medalists at the 2012 Summer Paralympics
Medalists at the 2016 Summer Paralympics
Commonwealth Games medallists in athletics
ACT Academy of Sport alumni
Paralympic medalists in athletics (track and field)
Medallists at the 2010 Commonwealth Games